A strada comunale (Italian for municipal road), abbreviated SC, is an Italian road. Municipal roads are maintained by comuni.

A municipal road is less important than a provincial road.

The types of municipal roads are the same ones of state highways.

See also
Transport in Italy
State highway
Regional road
Provincial road

Roads in Italy
Municipal roads